The Creamline Cool Smashers is a professional women's volleyball team playing in the Premier Volleyball League (PVL). The team is owned by the Republic Biscuit Corporation and named after its Creamline Dairy brand.

History 
The team debuted during the PVL's 1st season reinforced open conference on April 30, 2017.

Current roster 

Coaching staff
 Head coach:Sherwin Meneses
 Assistant coach:Karlo Martin Santos

Team staff
 Team manager:Ma. Carlota CeldaAlan Acero
 Trainers:Mark Christopher CaronAriel Morado Jr.

Medical staff
 Physical therapist:Anna Liza Demegillo

Previous roster 

Coaching staff
 Head coach:Sherwin Meneses
 Assistant coach:Karlo Martin Santos

Team staff
 Team manager:Ma. Carlota CeldaAlan Acero
 Trainers:Mark Christopher CaronAriel Morado Jr.

Medical staff
 Physical therapist:Anna Liza Demegillo

Coaching staff
 Head coach:Sherwin Meneses
 Assistant coach:Karlo Martin Santos

Team staff
 Team manager:Ma. Carlota CeldaAlan Acero
 Trainers:Mark Christopher CaronAriel Morado Jr.

Medical staff
 Physical therapist:Anna Liza Demegillo

Coaching staff
 Head coach:Sherwin Meneses
 Assistant coaches:Ed OrtegaKarlo SantosJoyce Palad

Team staff
 Team manager:Sherwin MalonzoAlan Acero
 Trainer:Eduardo OrtegaMark Caron

Medical staff
 Physical therapist:Geronimo Kamus

Indoor volleyball

Coaching staff
 Head coach:Anusorn Bundit
 Assistant coaches:Ed OrtegaKarlo SantosJoyce Palad

Team Staff
 Team Manager:Sherwin MalonzoAlan Acero
 Trainer:Eduardo OrtegaMark Caron

Medical Staff
 Physical Therapist:Geronimo Kamus

Beach volleyball

Coaching staff
 Head coach:Anusorn Bundit
 Assistant coaches:Ed OrtegaKarlo SantosJoyce Palad

Team Staff
 Team Manager:Sherwin MalonzoAlan Acero
 Trainer:Eduardo OrtegaMark Caron

Medical Staff
 Physical Therapist:Geronimo Kamus

Coaching staff
 Head coach: Anusorn "Tai" Bundit
 Assistant coaches: Ed Ortega Karlo Santos Joyce Palad

Team Staff
 Team Manager: Sherwin Malonzo Alan Acero
 Trainer: Eduardo Ortega Mark Caron

Medical Staff
 Physical Therapist: Geronimo Kamus

Coaching staff
 Head coach: Anusorn "Tai" Bundit
 Assistant coaches: Ed Ortega Oliver Allan Almadro Karlo Santos Joyce Palad

Team Staff
 Team Manager: Sherwin Malonzo
 Trainer: Eduardo Ortega

Medical Staff
 Team Physician:
 Physical Therapist: Geronimo Kamus

Coaching staff
 Head coach: Anusorn "Tai" Bundit
 Assistant coaches: Oliver Allan Almadro Ed Ortega Karlo Santos Joyce Palad

Team Staff
 Team Manager: Sherwin Malonzo
 Trainer: Eduardo Ortega

Medical Staff
 Team Physician:
 Physical Therapist: Geronimo Kamus

Coaching staff
 Head coach:Anusorn "Tai" Bundit
 Assistant coaches:Oliver AlmadroSherwin Meneses

Team Staff
 Team Manager:Atty. Lily GrubaSherwin Malonzo
 Trainer:Eduardo OrtegaJerod Hubalde

Medical Staff
 Team Physician:
 Physical Therapist:Geronimo Kamus

Coaching staff
 Head coach: Anusorn "Tai" Bundit
 Assistant coaches: Oliver Almadro Sherwin Meneses Jerod Hubalde

Team Staff
 Team Manager: Sherwin Malonzo
 Team Utility: 

Medical Staff
 Team Physician:
 Physical Therapist:

Philippines women's national volleyball team  
In August 2022, the initial roster of the Philippines women's national volleyball team consists mainly of NU Lady Bulldogs was released by the PNVF after NU begs off to join the 2022 Premier Volleyball League Invitational Conference. As the result, the Champion or the best performing local team in the Invitational Conference will represent the Philippine national team. The eventual champions, the Creamline Cool Smashers accepted the federation's invite to represent the country.

On August 17, 2022, the PNVF announced the official lineup for the 2022 Asian Women's Volleyball Cup. Only 14 players were allowed to play, Rizza Jane Mandapat and Lorielyn Bernardo were originally not part of the Philippine team in the AVC Cup but a few days before the game, Coach Sherwin Meneses confirmed that Alyssa Valdez would not play for the tournament due to dengue and Rizza Jane Mandapat will replace her. Lorielyn Bernardo became the replacement of Risa Sato due to Sato's health reasons.

After the recently held AVC Cup, the squad was tasked to join the 2022 ASEAN Grand Prix. Sato would eventually join the team, meanwhile Valdez joined the trip but she was still not part of the lineup due to her recovery from dengue.

Philippine national team roster for 2022 AVC Cup for Women 

The following persons were assigned by the Philippine National Volleyball Federation as part of the coaching staff.

Honors

Team

Individual

Imports

Team captains 
  Alyssa Valdez (2017-present)
  Jia Morado-De Guzman (2023) - Interim Captain

Coaches 
  Anusorn "Tai" Bundit (2017–18; 2019–2021)
  Li Huanning (2019, withdrew)
  Sherwin Meneses (2022–present)

Former players 

Local players

 Alexine Danielle Cabaños
 Jem Nicole Gutierrez
 Jonalyn Ibisa
 Paula Maninang
 Angela Nunag
 Mary Jean Balse-Pabayo
 Joyce Antonniette Palad
 Aerieal Patnongon
 Aurea Francesca Racraquin
 Ivy Elayne Remulla
 Janet Serafica
 Jamela Suyat
 Heather Anne Guino-o
 Melissa Gohing-Nacino
 Coleen Laurice Bravo 

Foreign players

 Kuttika Kaewpin

 Nikolina Aščerić

 Laura Schaudt

 Aleoscar Blanco

 Yeliz Başa

References 

2017 establishments in the Philippines
Volleyball clubs established in 2017
Shakey's V-League
Women's volleyball teams in the Philippines